Emile Frederick Fritz Jr. (February 1920 – September 14, 2015) was an American football player. Fritz was selected in the thirteenth round of the 1947 NFL Draft.

In the late 1930s, Fritz attended Vanderbilt University, where he played on the football team as a guard.

A World War II veteran, he enlisted in the Army Air Force shortly after the attack on Pearl Harbor in 1941 and served as a B-17 mechanic. He served overseas in the United States military before enrolling again in college, this time at the University of Maryland. At Maryland in 1945, Fritz played under head coach Paul "Bear" Bryant, who had been an assistant coach for Fritz at Vanderbilt before the war.

In 1946, the Associated Press named Fritz an honorable mention All-American.

Fritz was selected in the thirteenth round of the 1947 NFL Draft (115th overall) by the Chicago Bears.

At Maryland, Fritz was a member of the Delta Phi chapter of the Sigma Nu fraternity.

Fritz died on September 14, 2015, at the age of 95, in Woodstown, New Jersey.

References 

Vanderbilt Commodores football players
Maryland Terrapins football players
American football offensive guards
United States Army Air Forces personnel of World War II
Chicago Bears players
1920 births
2015 deaths
United States Army Air Forces soldiers
People from Woodstown, New Jersey